Alcmanian verse refers to the dactylic tetrameter in Greek and Latin poetry.

Dactylic tetrameter in Alcman
Ancient metricians called the dactylic tetrameter the Alcmanic because of its use by the Archaic Greek poet Alcman, as in fragment 27 PMG:

| – uu – uu – uu – uu |
| – uu – uu – uu – uu |
| – – – uu – uu – uu |

This length is scanned like the first four feet of the dactylic hexameter (giving rise to the name dactylic tetrameter a priore).  Thus, a spondee substitutes for a dactyl in the third line, but the lines end with dactyls (not spondees).

The Alcmanian strophe
Horace composed some poems in the Alcmanian strophe or Alcmanian system, a couplet consisting of a dactylic hexameter followed by a dactylic tetrameter a posteriore (so called because it ends with a spondee, thus resembling the last four feet of the hexameter).  Examples are Odes I.7 and I.28, and Epode 12 ("Quid tibi vis, mulier nigris dignissima barris? / munera quid mihi quidve tabellas").

Later Latin poets use the dactylic tetrameter a priore as the second verse of the Alcmanian strophe.  For example, Boethius' Consolation of Philosophy I.m.3:

     

     

     

     

     

(Ausonius uses couplets of a dactylic tetrameter a priore followed by a hemiepes in Parentalia 27)

In modern poetry
The term "Alcmanian" is sometimes applied to modern English dactylic tetrameters (e.g. Robert Southey's "Soldier's Wife": "Wild-visaged Wanderer, ah, for thy heavy chance!"), or to poems (e.g. in German) that strictly imitate Horace's meters.

References

Types of verses
Ancient Greek poetry
Latin poetry